Om Prakash Malik (born September 29, 1966) is an Indian-American web and technology writer.  He is the founder and a former senior writer for GigaOM. He is now a partner at True Ventures.

Personal life and education 
Malik was born in New Delhi. He graduated from St. Stephens’ College in New Delhi in 1986, with an honors degree in chemistry.

Career 
Malik started out as a young writer in India, working with Delhi-based Newsmen Features, where he specialised in lifestyle features.

He moved to New York City in 1993 to be a writer for India Abroad and then for Forbes. He was also a senior writer for Red Herring, focusing on the telecommunications sector, and later became a senior writer there. In late 1994, he launched DesiParty.com, an events site for Indian immigrants.  That same year, he co-founded the South Asian Journalists Association (SAJA). In 1995 he helped launch the now-defunct magazine, Masala, and its website Masala.com, a South Asian portal.

In 1997, Malik was on the original team at Forbes.com led by David Churbuck.  In 1999 he left Forbes.com to work in the venture capital world, serving as an investment manager at Hambrecht & Quist Asia Pacific; his stay there lasted only a few months because he decided he preferred being a writer.

In 2000, he moved to San Francisco, California to write for Business 2.0 magazine. In 2001, he started GigaOM, a blog published by GigaOmniMedia, Inc. in San Francisco. The website had a monthly global audience of over 500,000, and was among the top 50 blogs worldwide by Technorati rank. and was part of CNet's 100 Most Influential Blogs.

His first book, Broadbandits: Inside the $750 Billion Telecom Heist, was released on May 15, 2003. Malik's writings have also appeared in newspapers and magazines such as The Wall Street Journal, Brandweek, and Crain's New York Business.

Malik announced on June 12, 2006, that he was going to work on GigaOM full-time, although he continued to be a contributing editor and had a regular column in Business 2.0 until its demise in October 2007. In addition to GigaOM, he also wrote for the blogs Web Worker Daily and Tablatronic.

From July 2007 to March 2008, Malik hosted the podcast The GigaOm Show on Revision3 with Joyce Kim, which focused on technology and business. He ended the podcast to focus on other things, among them his health. Malik was also a frequent guest on the former CrankyGeeks podcast with John C. Dvorak.

Malik left GigaOM  in January 2014. In March 2015, the company ceased operations. In August 2015, the blog resumed under different ownership.

See also 
 TechCrunch

References

Further reading

External links 

 Om's Personal Blog
 Interview with Sramana Mitra
 NYT article about bloggers, including Om
 Tech Blog GigaOm Abruptly Shuts Down
 GigaOm Was Universally Respected. Too Bad Respect Doesn’t Pay the Bills.

1966 births
American male writers of Indian descent
American bloggers
Indian emigrants to the United States
American male journalists
American writers of Indian descent
Living people
People from Delhi
Revision3
American technology writers
21st-century American non-fiction writers
American male bloggers